Jeverson Wilson Walter Balbino (born 20 June 1979), known as China Balbino, is a Brazilian football manager and former player who played as a central defender. He is the current manager of São Paulo-RS.

Honours

Player
Ulbra
Campeonato Gaúcho Série A2: 2002

Notes

External links

1979 births
Living people
Brazilian footballers
Association football defenders
Esporte Clube São Luiz players
Canoas Sport Club players
Porto Alegre Futebol Clube players
Futebol Clube Santa Cruz players
Grêmio Esportivo Bagé players
Clube Esportivo Lajeadense players
Ypiranga Futebol Clube players
Iraty Sport Club players
Brazilian football managers
Esporte Clube São José managers
Grêmio Esportivo Glória managers
Esporte Clube Avenida managers
Sport Club São Paulo managers
Sportspeople from Rio de Janeiro (state)
People from Itaboraí